The man on the Clapham omnibus is a hypothetical ordinary and reasonable person, used by the courts in English law where it is necessary to decide whether a party has acted as a reasonable person would – for example, in a civil action for negligence. The character is a reasonably educated, intelligent but nondescript person, against whom the defendant's conduct can be measured.

The term was introduced into English law during the Victorian era, and is still an important concept in British law. It is also used in other Commonwealth common law jurisdictions, sometimes with suitable modifications to the phrase as an aid to local comprehension. The route of the original "Clapham omnibus" is unknown but London Buses route 88 was briefly branded as "the Clapham Omnibus" in the 1990s and is sometimes associated with the term.

History
The phrase was reportedly first put to legal use in a judgment by Sir Richard Henn Collins MR in the 1903 English Court of Appeal libel case, McQuire v. Western Morning News. 

He attributed it to Lord Bowen.

It may be derived from the phrase "Public opinion ... is the opinion of the bald-headed man at the back of the omnibus", a description by the 19th-century journalist Walter Bagehot of a normal London man. Clapham, in South London, was at the time a nondescript commuter suburb seen to represent "ordinary" London, and in the 19th century would have been served by horse-drawn omnibuses. Omnibus is the term from which "bus" derives, and was still in common use by the judiciary at the beginning of the 20th century.

The concept was used by Lord Justice Greer, in the case of Hall v. Brooklands Auto-Racing Club, to define the standard of care a defendant must live up to in order to avoid being found negligent.

The use of the phrase was reviewed by the UK Supreme Court in Healthcare at Home Limited v. The Common Services Agency, where Lord Reed said:

Other related common law jurisdictions

The expression has also been incorporated in Canadian patent jurisprudence, notably Beloit v. Valmet Oy in its discussion of the test for obviousness.

In Australia, the "Clapham omnibus" expression has inspired the New South Wales and Victorian equivalents, "the man on the Bondi tram" (a now disused tram route in Sydney), and "the man on the Bourke Street tram" (Melbourne). In Western Australia, the equivalent is "the man on the Prospector to Kalgoorlie".

In Hong Kong, the equivalent expression is "the man on the Shaukiwan Tram".

See also
 A moron in a hurry
 Bellwether
 Person having ordinary skill in the art
 Placeholder name
 Prudent man rule
 Objective historian

References

British English idioms
English phrases
Legal fictions
Socioeconomic stereotypes